The Cabinet Weil I was the state government of the German state of Lower Saxony from 19 February 2013 until 22 November 2017. The Cabinet was headed by Minister President Stephan Weil and was formed by the Social Democratic Party and the Alliance '90/The Greens, after Weil's winning of the 2013 Lower Saxony state election. On 19 February 2013, Weil was elected and sworn in as Minister President by the Landtag of Lower Saxony.

At the beginning of August 2017, the government lost its one-vote majority when Elke Twesten, a member of the Greens, left the parliamentary group. On 7 August 2017, the represented in the state parliament agreed on October 15, 2017 as the election date for a new state elections. The cabinet was succeeded by Weils's second cabinet.

Composition 

|}

Reference 

Weil
2013 establishments in Germany
2017 disestablishments in Germany